Rubén Darío Ferrer  (born 31 January 1975 in Rawson, Chubut) is a retired Argentine footballer.

External links
 Statistics at FutbolXXI.com  
 Statistics at Guardian's Stats Centre

1975 births
Living people
People from Rawson, Chubut
Argentine people of Catalan descent
Argentine footballers
Unión de Santa Fe footballers
Defensa y Justicia footballers
Aldosivi footballers
Club Atlético Los Andes footballers
Club de Gimnasia y Esgrima La Plata footballers
San Martín de San Juan footballers
C.S. Marítimo players
C.S. Emelec footballers
C.D. Técnico Universitario footballers
Expatriate footballers in Chile
Association football forwards